Michael Booker (born 22 October 1947) is an English former professional footballer who played as a left back in the Football League for Barnsley and Bradford (Park Avenue).

References

1947 births
Living people
Footballers from Barnsley
English footballers
Association football fullbacks
Barnsley F.C. players
Bradford (Park Avenue) A.F.C. players
English Football League players